Ibrahim Dossey Allotey (24 November 1972 in Accra – 9 December 2008 in Bucharest) was a Ghanaian football goalkeeper.

Career
Dossey was born in Accra, Ghana. He played in Romania for Rapid București, FC Brașov, Pandurii Târgu Jiu, and Unirea Sânnicolau Mare. Dossey was brought to Romania by former Ghana and Accra Hearts of Oak coach Petre Gavrilă in 2000.

Death
Dossey had signed with FCM Târgovişte two days before he crashed his car on 13 September 2008, near Breaza, Prahova County, and fell into a coma. His wife and two children were not hurt in the accident. He was in a coma for nearly three months, before he died in Bagdasar Arseni Hospital-Bucharest on 9 December 2008, aged 36. He was buried in Hârşova, Romania on 10 December.

International
His team won Africa's first Olympic football medal at the 1992 Summer Olympics.

Reactions
Bogdan Lobonţ: "I cannot believe it! I had hoped that Dossey's medical condition would improve. I am sad, Romanian football has lost a valuable goalkeeper. God rest his soul!"

Tedy Dragomir (the owner of Playboy): "We are deeply pained by this, I cannot believe it. We tried so hard in order to make him well. We had almost collected all the money needed for his treatment."

Ioan Neculaie (the owner of FC Brașov): "I met Dossey only as a player for the club I own, but I can say about him that I never heard anyone saying bad things about him. His character was an example. It is unbelievable."

References

External links
 1992 Olympic football tournament (FIFA.com)
 
 Accident news report 
 
 
 

1972 births
2008 deaths
Road incident deaths in Romania
Ghanaian footballers
Ghanaian expatriate footballers
Footballers at the 1992 Summer Olympics
Olympic footballers of Ghana
Olympic bronze medalists for Ghana
FC Rapid București players
FC Brașov (1936) players
CS Pandurii Târgu Jiu players
CS Unirea Sânnicolau Mare players
Footballers from Accra
Expatriate footballers in Romania
Liga I players
Ghanaian expatriate sportspeople in Romania
Olympic medalists in football
Medalists at the 1992 Summer Olympics
Association football goalkeepers